Crying Wolf: Exposing the Wolf Reintroduction to Yellowstone National Park is a 2011 independent documentary film by Jeffrey D. King, the founder of Broken Hints Media. It delves into the controversial Wolf reintroduction in Yellowstone issue, as well as environmentalism and conservationism in general from a Christian perspective.

The Director and his Motivations
The director and producer of the film, Jeffrey D. King, a former resident of rural Montana in the area around Yellowstone, grew up familiar with the issue of wolf reintroduction, and was inspired to make the film by his religious convictions and his passions for wildlife and videography.

The film explores the Christian concept of taking dominion (Genesis 1:28, repeating, in command form, the part of God's plan also contained in Genesis 1:26). The Dominion Mandate, the idea, is not to be confused with Dominionism or Dominion Theology, both of which are rooted in that concept. In Christianity, taking dominion (using the earth and its resources for the needs of man and to the glory of God) is the corollary of Biblical stewardship (conserving those resources for later use or for aesthetic reasons and to the glory of God), both concepts being primarily derived from the passage in Genesis. The preceding two verses, Genesis 1:26, 27

are the basis for Imago Dei, wherefrom Christians hold that man ultimately derives his nature, distinctiveness, value, rights, will, individuality, and sovereignty, but also his subordinate status to his Creator.

Content
Featured in the film as interviewees are retired USFWS biologist Jim Beers, Stephen Vantassel Ph.D., Rocky Mountain Elk Foundation President David Allen, and Abundant Wildlife Society of North America's founder, Troy R. Mader, as well as outfitter Bill Hoppe and a number of ranchers. Interviews (conducted by the director) and original footage of wolves, bears, buffalo, elk, as well as scenery from Montana, Wyoming, and Idaho, especially in and around Yellowstone Park are the bulk of the film, but also included are photos of wolves, livestock, wildlife, historical figures (such as U.S. Presidents Teddy Roosevelt, an avid hunter, and Bill Clinton, and soldier 'Yellowstone' Kelly) and the like.

References

External links
 

2011 films
American documentary films
2011 documentary films
2010s American films